Carlos Eduardo de Oliveira Alves (born 17 October 1989), known as Carlos Eduardo, is a Brazilian professional footballer who plays for Botafogo de Futebol e Regatas as a midfielder.

Club career

Early years and Estoril
Born in Ribeirão Preto, São Paulo, Carlos Eduardo played youth football for three clubs. He started his senior career with Desportivo Brasil, who loaned him several times for the duration of his contract; in the Série A, he represented Fluminense FC and Grêmio Barueri Futebol.

Carlos Eduardo moved to Portugal in January 2011, being loaned to G.D. Estoril Praia of the Segunda Liga. He contributed 23 matches and one goal in his first full season, to help his team win the league and return to the Primeira Liga after a seven-year absence.

Carlos Eduardo made his debut in the Portuguese top division on 17 August 2012, coming on as a 60th-minute substitute in a 2–1 away loss against S.C. Olhanense. He totalled nearly 1,600 minutes of action – notably scoring twice in a 4–0 home win over C.D. Nacional– during the campaign as the Lisbon club overachieved for a final fifth position and qualified for the UEFA Europa League.

Porto
On 22 May 2013, Carlos Eduardo signed a four-year contract with another Portuguese side, FC Porto, alternating between the main squad and the reserves in his first year. For 2014–15, he was loaned to France's OGC Nice.

Carlos Eduardo scored five times in Nice's 7–2 away rout of En Avant Guingamp on 26 October 2014, including a first-half hat-trick.

Al Hilal
In the summer of 2015, Carlos Eduardo joined Al Hilal SFC. In his very first appearance with the Saudi club, on 12 August 2015, he netted the only goal in a win against Al Nassr FC in the Saudi Super Cup at Loftus Road. Late in the month, in two games separated by four days, he helped defeat Lekhwiya SC (4–1 home victory, in the AFC Champions League) and Al Fateh SC (2–1, away) by scoring a total of three times.

On 15 August 2017, Carlos Eduardo scored twice in a 4–3 home victory over Al Taawoun FC. On 24 November 2019, even though he did not take part in the final, the side conquered the Champions League after a 20-year wait.

Shabab Al Ahli
Carlos Eduardo agreed to a three-year deal at Shabab Al Ahli Club of the UAE Pro League in late August 2020, on a free transfer.

Personal life
Carlos Eduardo married Stéphannie Oliveira (born 1991), daughter of fellow footballer Bebeto.

Career statistics

Honours
Estoril
Segunda Liga: 2011–12

Al Hilal
Saudi Professional League: 2016–17, 2017–18, 2019–20
King Cup: 2017
Saudi Crown Prince Cup: 2015–16
Saudi Super Cup: 2015, 2018
AFC Champions League: 2019

Shabab Al Ahli
UAE Super Cup: 2020
UAE League Cup: 2020–21

Individual
Saudi Professional League Player of the Month: October 2019
FIFA Club World Cup Bronze Ball: 2019

References

External links

1989 births
Living people
Brazilian footballers
Footballers from São Paulo (state)
Association football midfielders
Campeonato Brasileiro Série A players
Desportivo Brasil players
Ituano FC players
Fluminense FC players
Grêmio Barueri Futebol players
Botafogo de Futebol e Regatas players
Primeira Liga players
Liga Portugal 2 players
G.D. Estoril Praia players
FC Porto B players
FC Porto players
Ligue 1 players
OGC Nice players
Saudi Professional League players
Al Hilal SFC players
Al-Ahli Saudi FC players
UAE Pro League players
Shabab Al-Ahli Club players
Brazilian expatriate footballers
Expatriate footballers in Portugal
Expatriate footballers in France
Expatriate footballers in Saudi Arabia
Expatriate footballers in the United Arab Emirates
Brazilian expatriate sportspeople in Portugal
Brazilian expatriate sportspeople in France
Brazilian expatriate sportspeople in Saudi Arabia
Brazilian expatriate sportspeople in the United Arab Emirates